The Darmstadt Electronic Computing Machine (DERA), (German:Darmstädter Elektronischer Rechenautomat) was an experimental, room-sized electronic computer calculator with vacuum tube built in 1951. It was built at the Technische Universität Darmstadt under the direction of Alwin Walther.  The first operation was in 1957, with development completed in 1959.

Technical data 
 Start of construction in 1950/51, start of use in 1957, completed in 1959 
 Programming languages: in addition to machine code also ALGOL.
 I / O device: telegraph (paper tape reader).
 Word machine with George Stibitz, from George Stibitz (also  excess - 3  code), 20 bit (13 decimal places + sign)
 Command length 7 digits
 Drum memory with 3000 words
 Ferrite core register (20 ms access time)
 Clock frequency 200 kHz (addition 0.8 ms; multiplication 12 - 16 ms)
 Components: 1,400 tubes, 8,000 diodes, 90 relays

See also 
 CAB500
 Carousel memory (magnetic rolls)
 Karlqvist gap
 Manchester Mark 1

References

External links 
Youtube of the Darmstadt Electronic Computing Machine (DERA) - Documentary from 1963
 Librascope LGP-30: The drum memory computer referenced in the above story, also referenced on Librascope LGP-30.
 Librascope RPC-4000: Drum memory computer referenced in the above story
 Oral history interview with Dean Babcock

German inventions
Electronic calculators